Guno Henry George Castelen is a Surinamese Labour Party legislator and former Minister for Transportation, Communication, & Tourism. Alice Amafo succeeded him as  Minister for Transportation, Communication, & Tourism.

References 

People from Paramaribo
Government ministers of Suriname
Members of the National Assembly (Suriname)
Surinamese Labour Party politicians
Living people
1962 births